Bagua Anantapur, also known as Bugwah, is a village in Hatia Union of Ulipur Upazila, Kurigram District, Rangpur Division, Bangladesh, on the Jamuna river. It is the site of Bagua, Anantapur Government Primary School and Bagua, Anantapur High School, founded in 1933.

References

Populated places in Rangpur Division